Frederick Byerley (9 July 1910 – 19 August 1994) was a New Zealand cricketer. He played one first-class match for Auckland in 1931/32.

Byerley's only first-class match was against the touring South Africans in February 1932. In Auckland's first innings he went to the wicket with the score at 123 for 6 and hit 77 at a run a minute.

Byerley served in the New Zealand Expeditionary Force in Europe in World War II. He was captured by the Germans and held at Stalag VIII-B prisoner of war camp. After the war ended in Europe he was a member of the New Zealand Services cricket team that played in England in 1945.

See also
 List of Auckland representative cricketers

References

External links
 

1910 births
1994 deaths
New Zealand cricketers
Auckland cricketers
Cricketers from Wellington City
New Zealand prisoners of war in World War II